William James McClure MBE (15 June 1926 – 3 August 2014) was a Unionist politician based in Coleraine, Northern Ireland, who served as President of the Democratic Unionist Party. McClure died on 3 August 2014 at the age of 88.

McClure was first elected in 1975 to the Northern Ireland Constitutional Convention representing Londonderry. He was elected to the Northern Ireland Assembly in 1982 for the same constituency. In 1977 he was elected to Coleraine Borough Council and remained a member until his death, serving as Mayor from 1983–84, and from 1997–99, and as Deputy Mayor from 1982–83, 1985–93, and 2004–05. He served on the Coleraine Policing and Community Safety Partnership.

McClure was a fundamentalist Protestant and a member of the Independent Orange Order. He was an opponent of commercial trading, gambling and football games being played on Sundays, arguing that "the Christian Sabbath is a day for God not for gambling. It is a day for worshipping the Saviour, not for sport."

References

1926 births
2014 deaths
Place of birth missing
Christian fundamentalists
Mayors of Coleraine
Democratic Unionist Party councillors
Members of the Northern Ireland Constitutional Convention
Members of the Order of the British Empire
Northern Ireland MPAs 1982–1986
Democratic Unionist Party parliamentary candidates